The 1994 San Miguel Beermen season was the 20th season of the franchise in the Philippine Basketball Association (PBA).

11th championship
San Miguel won their first three games of the season and had the best won-loss record in the eliminations of the All-Filipino Cup with eight wins and two losses.  The Beermen made it to the finals first and went on to play the Coney Island Ice Cream Stars for the All-Filipino Cup crown as the two teams battle for the All-Filipino supremacy for the third straight year. San Miguel regain the championship over the defending champions Coney Island, winning in six games to become the first team in the 1990s era to win two consecutive titles since the same San Miguel team won the Grandslam in 1989. An added incentive to their finals victory was the right to represent the Philippines for the Asian Games basketball Gold as well as being seeded into the semifinal round of the season-ending Governor's Cup.

Occurrences
After winning over the Swift Mighty Meaties in Game One of their series for third place in the Commissioner's Cup, the San Miguel Beermen forfeited third-place trophy and requested the PBA to allow them to carry the national team colors for the remaining games as part of their tune-up in preparation for the upcoming Hiroshima Asian Games in October. The Beermen began playing with amateur cagers Marlou Aquino, Dennis Espino, Kenneth Duremdes, Jeffrey Cariaso, Edward Joseph Feihl and Bryant Punzalan joining the Philippine team.

Roster

Transactions

Trades

Additions

Recruited imports

References

San Miguel Beermen seasons
San